= Mohra Nabi Shah =

- Town
- Location within Pakistan
- Coordinates: 33.27°N 73.15°E
- Country: Pakistan
- Province: (Islamabad Capital Territory) Islamabad C.T
- Elevation: 553 m (1,814 ft)

Population
  - Total: 58,302
- Time zone: UTC+5 (PST)

Mohra Nabi Shah is a town in the Islamabad Capital Territory of Pakistan. It is located at 33° 27' 0N 73° 15' 55E with an altitude of 553 metres (1817 feet).
